Marco Keiner (born 13 April 1963 in Überlingen, Germany) is Director, Environment, Housing and Land Management Division at the United Nations Economic Commission for Europe (UNECE).

Career
After completing his studies in geography at the universities of Erlangen-Nuremberg and Nice, and post-graduate studies in spatial planning at the Swiss Federal Institute of Technology (ETH) Zurich, he worked as spatial planner in the cantonal administrations of Zurich and St. Gallen. He then worked as development aid worker in Mali and Benin where he drafted his PhD thesis on sustainability-oriented land use planning in the Sahel zone. He obtained his doctoral degree in 1999 at the Catholic University of Eichstätt-Ingolstadt. From 2000 to 2007, Keiner was senior research assistant at the Institute for Spatial and Landscape Development at ETH Zurich and senior lecturer for Geography at the University of Innsbruck, where he obtained his habilitation in 2005. In 2007, he became Chief, Urban Environment Section at UN-HABITAT in Nairobi. From 2008-2010, he was Director, Environment, Housing and Land Management Division at the United Nations Economic Commission for Europe (UNECE) in Geneva. In 2009  he was quoted as supporting environment stabilization in potential conflict  zones, saying ""In a sense, this is war prevention. When environmental quality worsens in a region, tensions can occur, which can lead to conflict.". Since 2011, Marco Keiner is Director, Environment Division at UNECE.

Publications

Books 
Keiner, Marco (Ed.): Sustainable Urban Development in China – Wishful Thinking or Reality? Monsenstein und Vannerdat: Münster. 2008, 
Keiner, Marco: Sustainable Futures for Switzerland, Europe and the World. Monsenstein und Vannerdat: Münster. 2007, 
Keiner, Marco (Ed.): The Future of Sustainability.Contributors: Ernst Ulrich von Weizsäcker, Mikhail Gorbachev, Dennis Meadows, Peter Marcuse, Alan AtKisson, Helena Norberg-Hodge, Albert Allen Bartlett, Marios Camhis, Herman Daly, Mathis Wackernagel, Klaus Leisinger. Springer: Dordrecht. 2006 
Keiner, Marco: Planungsinstrumente einer nachhaltigen Raumentwicklung.Innsbrucker Geographische Studien, Band 35, 
Keiner, Marco / Schmid, Willy A. / Koll-Schretzenmayr, Martina (Eds.): Managing Urban Futures: Sustainability and Urban Growth in Developing Countries. Ashgate Publishers: Aldershot. 2005, 
Keiner, Marco / Zegras, Christopher / Schmid, Willy A. / Salmerón, Diego (Eds.): From Understanding to Action: Sustainable Urban Development in Medium-Sized Cities in Africa and Latin America. Springer: Dordrecht. 2004, 
Koll-Schretzenmayr, Martina / Keiner, Marco / Nussbaumer, Gustav (Eds.): The Real and the Virtual Worlds of Spatial Planning. Springer: Berlin, Heidelberg. 2004, 
Keiner, Marco: Probleme der nachhaltigen agraren Ressourcennutzung in Westmali und planerische Lösungsansätze - Dargestellt am Cercle de Kita (Region Kayes). Dissertation, Katholische Universität Eichstätt, Shaker: Aachen 1999,

Scientific articles
Laukkonen, Julia / Kim Blanco, Paola / Lenhart, Jennifer / Keiner, Marco / Cavric, Branko / Kinuthia-Njenga, Cecilia: Combining Climate Change Adaptation and Mitigation Measures at the Local Level. Habitat International, Vol. 33/3 (2009): 287-292.
Keiner, Marco: Les impacts urbains du changement climatique dans les pays sen développement. Passages No. 158 (2009): 91-93.
Keiner, Marco / Kim, Arley: Transnational City Networks for Sustainability. European Planning Studies, Vol.15, Issue 10 (2007): 1369-1395.
Cavric, Branko / Keiner, Marco: Managing Development of a rapidly growing African city: A case of Gaborone, Botswana. Geoadria – Journal of the Croatian Geographical Society, Vol.11, No.1 (2007): 93-121.
Dammers, Ed / Keiner, Marco: Rural Development in Europe – Trends, Challenges and Prospects for the Future. DISP 166 (2006): 5-15.
Keiner, Marco: Re-Emphasizing Sustainable Development - The concept of 'Evolutionability': On living chances, equity, and good heritage. Environment, Development and Sustainability, Vol.6, Issue 4, 2004: 379-392.
Schultz, Barbara / Keiner, Marco / Schmid, Willy A.: Measuring quality in cantonal guiding planning in Switzerland. Built Environment Special issue on Measuring Quality in Planning, Vol. 29, No.4 (2003): 327-335.
Schultz, Barbara / Keiner, Marco: Indikatorengestütztes Controlling der Richtplanung in der Schweiz. Raumforschung und Raumordnung 5-6/2002: 366-376.
 Keiner, Marco: Indicator based control of regional planning. Australian Planner Vol. 39, No. 4, 2002: 205-210.

Book chapters
Keiner, Marco: China's Ascension and European Cities in 2040 - A Scenario. Kunzmann, K.R., Schmid, W.A., Koll-Schretzenmayr, M. (Eds.): China and Europe - The implications of the rise of China for European space. Routledge: London and New York (2010): 239-247.
Keiner, Marco: Regionalbewusstsein im Bodenseekreis - Häfler und Überlinger immer noch auf Distanz. Pfefferle, H. / Uffelmann, U. (Eds.): Politischer Regionalismus - Identitätsstiftung und Neugliederung im Südwesten und anderen deutschen Bundesländern. Ars Una: Neuried. 2009: 396-399.
Keiner, Marco / Kim, Arley: European City Networks on Energy Issues. Droege, P. (Ed.): Urban Energy Transition. Elsevier. 2007.
Keiner, Marco / Schmid, Willy A.: On the Way to Gigapolises: Can Global Urban Development Become Sustainable?. Mander, U., Brebbia, C.A. & Tiezzi, E. (Eds.): The Sustainable City IV: Urban Regeneration and Sustainability. WitPress: Southampton, Boston. 2006: 169-178.

References

External links
 Website of Marco Keiner 

German officials of the United Nations
1963 births
Living people